Luigi Luciano (born 7 March 1980, in Campobasso, Italy), better known as Herbert Ballerina, is an Italian radio host and actor. Since January 2011, he has been that radio show co-host of the Lo Zoo di 105 broadcast by Radio 105 Network.

Career
Luciano enrolled at the DAMS (Disciplines of Arts, Music and Entertainment) in Bologna, where he graduated in 2007. Later he moved to Milan, he joined the Shortcut Productions, initially as an assistant production and later as an actor and author. With Marcello Macchia he was protagonist of many comics trailers that make him famous and easily recognizable to the public for his innate humor. In 2010 he was contacted by Checco Zalone to play in his film Che bella giornata. Since 2011 he is the speaker for Lo Zoo di 105.
In 2017 he hosted "Prima Festival", a pre-show related to Sanremo Music Festival.

Filmography

Film
What a Beautiful Day (2010)
Italiano medio (2015)
On Air: Storia di un successo (2016)
Quel bravo ragazzo (2016)
Omicidio all'italiana (2017)
L'agenzia dei bugiardi (2019)
In vacanza su Marte (2020)

TV and webseries
 La villa di Lato, (2009)
 Drammi medicali, (2009)
 Mario, (2013–2014)
Bob Torrent (2015)

References

Italian radio presenters
Italian male actors
Living people
1980 births